The sixteen constituent states of Germany are divided into a total of 401 administrative Kreis or Landkreis; these consist of 294 rural districts ( or  – the latter in the states of North Rhine-Westphalia and Schleswig-Holstein only), and 107 urban districts ( or, in Baden-Württemberg only,  – cities that constitute districts in their own right).

List

Historical
Administrative divisions of East Germany
Administrative divisions of Nazi Germany

See also
Districts of Germany
States of Germany
 List of rural districts with populations and area 
 List of urban districts with populations and area

References 

Districts
Districts